Anne Villeneuve is an American geneticist. She is known for her work on the mechanisms governing chromosome inheritance during sexual reproduction.  Her work focuses on meiosis, the process by which a diploid organism, having two sets of chromosomes, produces gametes with only one set of chromosomes.  She is a Professor of Developmental Biology and of Genetics at Stanford University and a member of the National Academy of Sciences.

Career 
Villeneuve earned a B.S. in Biochemistry at the University of Notre Dame in 1981, and a Ph.D. in Biology from MIT in 1989, where she worked on sex determination and dosage compensation in the laboratory of Barbara J. Meyer.  She joined Stanford University as an Independent Fellow in 1989 and began to work on meiosis. She joined the faculty at Stanford in 1995.

Her work has been instrumental in establishing the nematode Caenorhabditis elegans as a major model system for investigating how homologous chromosomes pair up during meiosis, and how they recombine, exchanging genetic information. Her work has helped elucidate whether mechanisms of meiotic recombination are conserved from yeast to multicellular organisms.

Awards and honors 

 2019: Genetics Society of America Medal
 2017: Member, National Academy of Sciences
 2016: Member, American Academy of Arts and Sciences
 2016: American Cancer Society Research Professor Award, American Cancer Society
 2003: Kirsch Investigator Award, Steven and Michele Kirsch Foundation
 1999: Junior Faculty Scholar Award, Howard Hughes Medical Institute
 1996: Searle Scholars Award, Chicago Community Trust

References

External links 

 Anne Villeneuve (Stanford Profiles)

American geneticists
American women biologists
Massachusetts Institute of Technology School of Science alumni
University of Notre Dame alumni
Stanford University faculty
Living people
Members of the United States National Academy of Sciences
Year of birth missing (living people)
21st-century American women scientists
21st-century American biologists
20th-century American women scientists
20th-century American biologists